Gwassi Constituency was an electoral constituency in Kenya. It was one of two constituencies in the former Suba District, which has since been merged into Homa Bay County. The constituency had seven wards, all electing councillors to the Suba County Council.

Members of Parliament

Wards

References 

Suba District
Constituencies in Nyanza Province
Former constituencies of Kenya